A flour mill grinds cereal grain into flour and middlings.

Flour Mill or Flourmill may refer to:

Places
 Flour Mill, Ipswich, a heritage-listed former mill in Australia
 Flour Mill, Ontario, a neighbourhood in Sudbury

Other
 Flourmill Volcanoes, a small volcano range in British Columbia, Canada
 Flour Mills of Nigeria, a Nigerian agribusiness company

See also

 Flour Mill and Eco-Museum, Castelló d'Empúries, a museum in Catalonia